is a Japanese idol-themed mixed-media project created by Konami Digital Entertainment and Straight Edge. A light novel series written by Rakuda and illustrated by Buriki, titled Shine Post: Nee Shitteta? Watashi o Zettai Idol ni Suru Tame no, Goku Futsū de Atarimae na, to Bikkiri no Mahou, began publication by ASCII Media Works under their Dengeki Bunko imprint in October 2021. A manga series with art by Makiko Kawasemi was serialized in Media Factory's seinen manga magazine Monthly Comic Alive from January to November 2022, and a mobile game by Akihiro Ishihara will be developed by Konami Digital Entertainment for Android and iOS. An anime television series by Studio Kai aired from July to October 2022.

Characters

TINGS

One of the members of TINGS. She has a calm personality, but will sometimes lash out at the others when needed. She is skilled in dancing.

One of the members of TINGS. Due to a falling out, she and Yukine decided to leave TINGS and form a duo named YukiMoji, although they later rejoin TINGS.

She is the lead character of the series, and an idol who belongs to Brightest. She has a cheerful personality, and was inspired to become an idol after seeing Hotaru's concert. She wears glasses when not doing idol activities. She was formerly a member of HY:RAIN.

One of the members of TINGS. Due to a falling out, she and Momiji decided to leave TINGS and form a duo named YukiMoji, although they later rejoin TINGS. Both of her parents are actors.

One of the members of TINGS. She's very confident about her abilities.

HY:RAIN

The leader of HY:RAIN and Haru's childhood friend. She also goes to the same high school as her. She is disappointed Haru left HY:RAIN and seeks to bring her back to the group.

FFF

She is the leader of FFF, which is currently the most popular group in Brightest.

YuraYura Sisters

Hotaru

A popular idol who inspired all of TINGS' members to become idols. She often teases Naoki over the phone by telling him to "commit seppuku". She is called Kei by Naoki.

Others

The president of talent agency Brightest and Naoki's cousin. She took Haru into Brightest after the latter left HY:RAIN.

TINGS' manager and Yūki's cousin. He has the ability to see people shining when they lie. He is good friends with Hotaru, whom he calls Kei.

Media

Light novels
The Shine Post multimedia project began as a light novel series written by Rakuda and illustrated by Buriki. The series, titled , began publication by ASCII Media Works under Dengeki Bunko imprint with on October 8, 2021. Three volumes have been released as of July 8, 2022.

Manga
A manga series with art by Makiko Kawasemi was serialized in Media Factory's Monthly Comic Alive magazine from January 27 to November 26, 2022. Two tankōbon volumes were released between July 23 and December 22, 2022.

Anime
An anime television series was announced on October 26, 2021. The series was animated by Studio Kai and directed by Kei Oikawa, with SPP handling series composition, Tatsuto Higuchi and Rakuda, author of the light novel series, writing the scripts, Yoshihiro Nagata designing the characters, and Yōhei Kisara producing the music. Yasunori Nishiki and Tsubasa Ito composed the music. It aired from July 13 to October 19, 2022, on NTV's AnichU programming block, BS NTV, and AT-X. Sentai Filmworks has licensed the series. On August 16, 2022, it was announced that the seventh episode and beyond would be delayed due to COVID-19.

Episode list

Live concert
 TINGS LIVE JOURNEY ep.01 ～Departure～ Mini Live Event “Black or White? SPRING BOUT” (May 14, 2022)
 TINGS LIVE JOURNEY ep.02 “Re-Live” with HY:RAIN & HOTARU (March 11, 2023)

Game
A mobile game by Akihiro Ishihara and Konami Digital Entertainment titled  has been announced.

See also
 Oresuki—Another light novel series by the same author and illustrator.

Notes

References

External links
 
 
 
 

2021 Japanese novels
2022 anime television series debuts
Android (operating system) games
Anime and manga based on light novels
Anime postponed due to the COVID-19 pandemic
Anime productions suspended due to the COVID-19 pandemic
Dengeki Bunko
IOS games
Japan-exclusive video games
Japanese idols in anime and manga
Konami franchises
Konami games
Light novels
Media Factory manga
Nippon TV original programming
Seinen manga
Sentai Filmworks
Studio Kai
Upcoming video games
Video games developed in Japan